Escobar is a Spanish surname. Notable people with the surname include:

Abelardo Escobar Prieto, Mexican politician
Aida Luz Santos de Escobar, ambassador of El Salvador to Cyprus
Anasol Escobar, Colombian singer 
Alcides Escobar, Venezuelan baseball player
Álex Escobar (born 1965), Colombian footballer
Alex Escobar (presenter) (born 1974), Brazilian journalist and TV presenter
Alex Escobar (born 1978), Venezuelan baseball player
Alexander Escobar (born 1984), Salvadoran footballer
Alexander Escobar Gañán (born 1965), Colombian footballer
Alexandra Escobar (born 1980), Ecuadorian weightlifter
Ana Vilma de Escobar (born 1954), Salvadoran politician
Andrea Escobar (born 1992), Colombian actress
Andrés Escobar (1967–1994), Colombian footballer
Andrés Ramiro Escobar (born 1991), Colombian footballer
Ángel Escobar, Venezuelan baseball player
Antonio Escobar Núñez (born 1976), Spanish musician
Antonio Escobar y Mendoza, 17th-century Spanish ethicist
Arturo Escobar (anthropologist) (born 1952), Colombian-American anthropologist and development scholar
Arturo Escobar y Vega, Mexican politician
Brandon Escobar (born 1990), Honduran sport wrestler
Carlos Escobar Casarin (born 1990), Chilean footballer
Carlos Escobar Ortíz (born 1989), Chilean footballer
César Antonio Díaz Escobar, Chilean footballer
Daniel Escobar (1964–2013), American actor
Daniela Escobar (born 1969), Brazilian actress and television presenter
Darío Escobar (born 1971), Guatemalan artist
Eduardo Escobar (born 1989), Venezuelan baseball player
Edwin Escobar (born 1992), Venezuelan professional baseball player
Elizam Escobar (1948–2021), Puerto Rican painter
Enzo Escobar (born 1951), Chilean footballer
Eusebio Escobar (born 1936), Colombian footballer
Fabio Escobar (born 1982), Paraguayan footballer
Francisco Escobar (born 1991), Colombian beauty pageant winner
Gavin Escobar (1991–2022), American football player
Isabel Escobar, Brazilian-American environmental engineer
Jesús Escobar, American historian
José Escobar (baseball) (born in 1960), Venezuelan baseball player
José Escobar Saliente (1908–1994), Spanish comic writer and artist
Juan Carlos Escobar (born 1982), Colombian footballer
Juan Carlos Ortiz Escobar (Cuchilla), Colombian drug dealer
Sebastián Marroquín, born Juan Pablo Escobar
Juan Francisco Escobar (born 1949), Paraguayan football referee
José Luis Escobar Alas (born 1959), Salvadoran bishop
Juan M. Escobar, American judge
Katherine Escobar, Colombian model and actress
Kelvim Escobar (born 1976), Venezuelan baseball player
Luis Escobar (footballer) (born 1984), Colombian footballer
Luis Escobar (polo) (born 1971), American polo player
Luis Escobar (swimmer) (born 1984), Mexican swimmer
Luis Escobar Kirkpatrick (1908–1991), Spanish actor
Luis Antonio Escobar (composer)
Luis Antonio Escobar (footballer)
Manolo Escobar (1931–2013), Spanish singer
Marisol Escobar (1930–2016), Venezuelan-born sculptor
Matías Escobar (born 1982), Argentine footballer
Melba Escobar (born 1976) Colombian writer and journalist
Pablo Escobar (1949-1993), Colombian drug lord and narcoterrorist
Pablo Andrés Escobar (born 1987), Colombian footballer
Pablo Daniel Escobar (born 1978), Paraguayan-born Bolivian footballer
Pánfilo Escobar (born 1974), Paraguayan footballer
Patricio Escobar (1843–1912), President of Paraguay
Pedro de Escobar, 16th-century Portuguese composer
Pepe Escobar (born 1954), Brazilian investigative journalist
Pêro Escobar, 15th-century Portuguese explorer
Ramón Escobar Santiago (1937–2020), Spanish politician
Reynaldo Escobar Pérez, Mexican politician
Rolando Escobar (born 1981), Panamanian footballer
Ruth Escobar (1935–2017), Portuguese-born Brazilian actress, businesswoman, and politician
Sergi Escobar (born 1974), Spanish cyclist
Sílvio Escobar (born 1986), Paraguayan footballer
Sixto Escobar, Puerto Rican boxer
Susana Escobar (born 1987), Mexican swimmer
Ticio Escobar (born 1947), Paraguayan minister of culture
Veronica Escobar (born 1969), American politician from Texas
Vicente Escobar (1757–1834), Cuban painter
Walter Escobar (born 1968), Colombian footballer
Yasmani Copello Escobar (born 1987), Cuban-Turkish hurdler
Yunel Escobar (born 1982), Cuban-American baseball player

References

Spanish-language surnames
Surnames of Spanish origin
Spanish toponymic surnames